Koray Günter (born 16 August 1994) is a German professional footballer who plays as a centre-back for Italian  club Sampdoria on loan from Hellas Verona.

Personal life 
Günter was born in Höxter in North Rhine Westfalia. He went to König-Wilhelm-Highschool in Höxter and then switched to Leibniz-Gymnasium in Dortmund. He is in a relationship with Betty Taube, who is known for her participation in the German TV Show Germany's Next Topmodel. The two are engaged since January 2016.

On 11 October 2020, he tested positive for COVID-19.

Club career

Borussia Dortmund
Günter began his career in 2001 for SV Höxter, before moving to SpVg Brakel in 2006. Günter was elected sportsman of the year of Höxter in November 2011, and Günter was scouted by Borussia Dortmund at a Westfalen youth football tournament then enrolled into the Borussia Dortmund academy. Günter was previously an attacking player before being retrained as defender. He has played three seasons with the BVB academy since he joined BVB through to Borussia Dortmund II.

In the 2012–13 season, Günter succeeded to Borussia Dortmund II, playing in the German 3. Liga and on 28 August 2012, on the seventh match day of the 2012–13 3. Liga season, Günter made his debut in professional football, as he stood in the starting eleven of Borussia Dortmund II against Karlsruher SC. Günter was inducted into the Borussia Dortmund's first team in the 2012–13 Bundesliga season, where he was selected for the first time in the BVB squad as an unused substitute on 27 November 2012 in a home match against Fortuna Düsseldorf in the Bundesliga.

Galatasaray
Günter passed his medical and signed for four and half years with Galatasaray on 30 January 2014 for €2.5 million with Dortmund including a buy-back option worth €7 million.

On 12 July 2016, Günter injured while playing against Thun in a friendly match, suffered from ACL. The anticipated return to team was January–February 2017, reported by medical team.

Genoa
On 12 July 2018, Günter signed with Genoa a free transfer.

Loan to Hellas Verona
On 19 July 2019, Günter joined Hellas Verona on loan with an option to buy.

Sampdoria
On 31 January 2023, Günter joined Sampdoria on loan with an obligation to buy.

International career
Günter represented the Turkish U-16 national football team four times before he decided in the future to represent his country of birth Germany. Günter debuted for the German U-17 national football team on 4 September 2010, in an international friendly in Stadthagen against Azerbaijan U-17 national football team. In 2011, Günter represented the German U-17 national football team at the 2011 UEFA European Under-17 Football Championship in Serbia where the German team finished as runner-up and one month later Günter represented the German U-17 national football team at the 2011 FIFA U-17 World Cup in Mexico where the German team finished in third-place. Günter scored at the 2011 FIFA U-17 World Cup in the group game against Burkina Faso U-17 national football team, then he again scored in the second round of the 2011 FIFA U-17 World Cup in a 4–0 Germany victory against the United States U-17 national football team, before Günter again scored in the 2011 FIFA U-17 World Cup third-place match where Germany were victorious in a 4–3 victory against Brazil U-17 national football team. Günter's teammate Marvin Ducksch scored two goals at the World Cup and is also enrolled in the Borussia Dortmund II squad.

On 17 April 2012, Günter debuted made for the German U-19 national football team in a 0–0 draw against Czech Republic U-19 national football team.

Career statistics

Club

Honours
Galatasaray
 Süper Lig: 2014–15, 2017–18
 Türkiye Kupası: 2013–14, 2014–15, 2015–16
 Süper Kupa:: 2015, 2016

Germany
UEFA European Under-17 Football Championship runners-up: 2011
FIFA Under-17 World Cup third place: 2011

References

External links

1994 births
People from Höxter
Footballers from North Rhine-Westphalia
Sportspeople from Detmold (region)
German people of Turkish descent
Living people
German footballers
Turkish footballers
Germany youth international footballers
Turkey youth international footballers
Bundesliga players
3. Liga players
Süper Lig players
Serie A players
Borussia Dortmund II players
Borussia Dortmund players
Galatasaray S.K. footballers
Genoa C.F.C. players
Hellas Verona F.C. players
U.C. Sampdoria players
German expatriate footballers
Turkish expatriate footballers
Expatriate footballers in Italy
Association football central defenders